Microbacterium immunditiarum is a Gram-positive and non-spore-forming bacterium from the genus Microbacterium which has been isolated from soil from a municipal landfill in Chandigarh, India.

References

External links
Type strain of Microbacterium immunditiarum at BacDive -  the Bacterial Diversity Metadatabase	

Bacteria described in 2012
immunditiarum